Brush Creek is a stream in Platte County in the U.S. state of Missouri. It is a tributary of the Missouri River.
 
Brush Creek was so named on account of brush near its course.

References

Rivers of Platte County, Missouri
Rivers of Missouri